Bijapur Taluk, officially Vijayapura Taluka, is a taluka in the Indian state of Karnataka. It is located in the Bijapur district.  The administrative centre for Bijapur Taluka is in the city of Bijapur. The taluka is located in the southwest quadrant of the district.  In the 2011 census there were forty-six panchayat villages in Bijapur Taluka. The main river in the taluka is the Don River.

Geography
Bijapur Taluka is in the southwestern part of Bijapur District, with Maharashtra state and Indi Taluka to the north, Sindagi Taluka and Basavana Bagewadi Taluka to the east, Bagalkot District to the south, and Belgaum District and Maharashtra state to the west.

Demographics
In the 2001 India census, Bijapur Taluka reported 569,348 inhabitants, with 292,687 males (51.4%) and 276,661 females (48.6%), for a gender ratio of 945 females per 1000 males. Those 569,348 people represent 31.51% of the people in Bijapur District. Based upon households, the taluka was 45.2% urban in 2001; but based upon individuals it was only 44.6% urban. In either case,  Bijapur Taluka was the most urban in the district. The population density was 214 people per square kilometer, and as expected was the densest in the district. The overall literacy rate was 51.7%, the highest in the district. In terms of religion in 2001, Bijapur Taluka was 77.2% Hindu, 21.4% Muslim, 1.6% Christian, and 0.8% Jain. That was the lowest Hindu percentage in the district, and the highest Muslim, the highest Christian and the highest Jain percentages in the district.

Bijapur Taluka had one city, Bijapur C.M.C., and 118 villages, all of them inhabited. Of those villages forty-six were panchayat villages.

Electoral constituencies
For the Indian Parliament, the Lok Sabha, Bijapur Taluka participates in the Bijapur constituency.

Transport
Bijapur Taluka has five of the eighteen railroad stations in the district. There are 106 kilometres of National Highway in the taluka, 139 kilometres of State Highways and 638 km of major district roads.  The main highways in the taluka are the renumbered National Highway 50 and National Highway 52 (old NH13 and NH218). Additionally, the taluk is also served by newly declared National Highway 166E and National Highway 561A.

Points of interest in taluka
The mausoleum of Mohammed Adil Shah was built in 1659 and is topped by a large dome, the second largest dome, unsupported by pillars, in the world.

Villages
Villages in Vijayapur Taluk

Adavisangapur
Aheri
Ainapur
Agasanahalli
Alaginal
Aliyabad
Ankalagi
Arakeri
Arjunagi
Atalatti
Babaladi
Babaleshwar
Babanagar
Baratagi
Bellubbi
Bijjaragi
Bolachikkalaki
Bommanalli
Buranpur
Bhutnal

Chikkagalagali
Chintamani
Dadamatti
Danawadahatti
Dasyal
Devapur
Devar Gennur
Dhanaragi
Dhanyal
Domanal
Dudihal
Dyaberi
Gonasagi
Gugadaddi
Gunadal
Gunaki
Hadagali
Halagani
Hanchinal (PH)
Hanchinal (PM)

Hangaragi
Hanamasagar
Harnal
Hebbalahatti
Hegadihal
Hittinahalli
Hokkundi
Honaganahalli
Honawad
Honnāli
Honnutagi
Hosur
Hubanur
Hunsyal
Inganal
Itangihal
Jainapur
Jalageri
Jambagi (A)
Jambagi (H)

Jumnal
Kaggod
Kakanagiri
Kakhandaki
Khilarahatti
Krishnanagar
Kallakavatagi
Kambagi
Kanabur
Kanamadi
Kanamuchanal
Kannal
Kannur
Karjol
Katakanahalli
Katral
Kaulagi
Kengalagutti
Khatijapur
Kotabagi

Kotyal
Kamatagi
Kumate
Lingadahalli
Lohagaon
Madagunaki
Madasanal
Madabhavi
Makanapur
Malakandevarahatti
Mamadapur
Mangalur
Minchinal
Nagaral
Nagathan
Nandyal
Navarasapur
Nidoni
Ratnapur

Rambhapur
Rampur
Sangapur (SH)
Sarawad
Savanalli
Shegunashi
Shirabur
Shirnal
Shivanagi
Siddapur
Siddapur K
Somadevarahatti
Sutagundi
Tajapur
Tajapur H
Takkalaki
Tidagundi
Tiganibidari
Tikota
Tonsyal

Toravi
Ukumanal
Uppaladinni
Utnal
Yakkundi
Yatnal

Notes

External links

Taluks of Karnataka